Huia is a group of true frogs found in Southeast Asia. Many are commonly known as "torrent frogs" after their favorite habitat - small rapid-flowing mountain and hill streams -, but this name is used for many similar-looking frogs regardless of whether they are closely related. A seemingly less ambiguous name is huia frogs; however, the supposed genus seems actually to be a polyphyletic "wastebin taxon" and might contain only a fraction of the dozens of species placed here by some authors.

Several species of Amolops and Odorrana are highly convergent with Huia. O. absita for example is highly similar in habitus to the completely allopatric H. masonii. Though the latter might not be a member of Huia in the strictest sense, it is at least a very close relative.

In another incidence of convergent evolution yielding adaptation to habitat, the tadpoles of Amolops, Huia, Meristogenys as well as Rana sauteri have a raised and usually well-developed sucker on their belly. This is useful in keeping in place in rocky torrents, where these frogs grow up. But as Odorrana and Staurois from comparable habitat prove, this sucker is by no means a necessity and other means of adaptation to torrent habitat exist.

Systematics and taxonomy
Up to some 55 species are sometimes placed in Huia, including some originally placed into the genera Odorrana and Eburana, which formed a paraphyletic cluster; indeed these two genera are sometimes treated as junior synonyms of Huia. The Long-snout Torrent Frog on the other hand – formerly Huia nasica – is now in Odorrana. But many of the moves to Huia seem to be premature and it is better to treat Odorrana as valid, in a more comprehensive way and including Eburana, than expanding Huia.

For as it seems, even in the revised delimitation the genus is still paraphyletic with Meristogenys. Either the latter genus is included here, or Huia is restricted to the type species (the Hole-in-the-head Frog, H. cavitympanum) and what might be its closest living relatives (e.g. an undescribed species from Sumatra), or some species of Huia - e.g. the Sumatran Torrent Frog (H. sumatrana) - are split off again. The former alternatives seem to be more advisable as long as the interrelationships of Huia and Meristogenys species as well as the closely related Clinotarsus are as badly resolved as they are at present. Meristogenys tadpoles are furthermore characterized by a split and ridged upper lip not found in the Hole-in-the-head Frog, indicating that the genera ought to be kept separate.

New species are being discovered regularly, exacerbating the taxonomic uncertainties.

Species
The following species are recognised in the genus Huia:
 Huia cavitympanum – Hole-in-the-head frog
 Huia masonii – Javan torrent frog
 Huia melasma
 Huia sumatrana – Sumatran torrent frog
 Huia modiglianii

Footnotes

References

  (2007): Paraphyly of Chinese Amolops (Anura, Ranidae) and phylogenetic position of the rare Chinese frog, Amolops tormotus. Zootaxa 1531: 49–55. PDF abstract and first page text
  (2008): The phylogenetic problem of Huia (Amphibia: Ranidae). Mol. Phylogenet. Evol. 46(1): 49-60.  (HTMl abstract)

 
Amphibian genera